Johan Nilsson (2 December 1890 – 10 August 1959) was a Swedish wrestler. He competed in the lightweight event at the 1912 Summer Olympics.

References

External links
 

1890 births
1959 deaths
Olympic wrestlers of Sweden
Wrestlers at the 1912 Summer Olympics
Swedish male sport wrestlers
Sportspeople from Malmö